Jacques Flury (10 May 1932 – 23 October 1965) was a Swiss weightlifter. He competed in the men's middleweight event at the 1952 Summer Olympics. He died in 1965 while cycling when he was struck by a bus.

References

1932 births
1965 deaths
Swiss male weightlifters
Olympic weightlifters of Switzerland
Weightlifters at the 1952 Summer Olympics
Place of birth missing
Road incident deaths in Switzerland
Cycling road incident deaths